BANIF may refer to:

 Banif Financial Group a Portuguese financial services company originally from Funchal
 Banco BANIF, S.A, a Spanish private banking institution, which is a subsidiary of the Santander Group